Abbakumovo is a rural locality (a village) in Posyolok Urshelsky of Gus-Khrustalny District, Vladimir Oblast, Russia. The population was 117 as of 2010.

Geography 
The village is located on the bank of the Pol River, 26 km west of Gus-Khrustalny (the district's administrative centre) by road. Zabolotye is the nearest rural locality.

References 

Rural localities in Gus-Khrustalny District
Sudogodsky Uyezd